Valle Hermoso is the main city in the municipality of Valle Hermoso  in the northeastern part of the Mexican state of Tamaulipas.  The city serves as the municipal seat of the municipality, which is bordered by the municipalities of Matamoros and Río Bravo. At the 2010 census the city had a population of 48,918 inhabitants, while the municipality had a population of 63,170.

References

2010 census tables: INEGI: Instituto Nacional de Estadística, Geografía e Informática.
Tamaulipas Enciclopedia de los Municipios de México.

Populated places in Tamaulipas